Kim Myong-son (born 9 March 1976) is a North Korean diver. She competed in the women's 3 metre springboard event at the 1992 Summer Olympics.

References

1976 births
Living people
North Korean female divers
Olympic divers of North Korea
Divers at the 1992 Summer Olympics
Place of birth missing (living people)